William (Bill) Robert Barker is an Honorary Research Associate of the State Herbarium of South Australia.

He is a former Chief Botanist of the State Herbarium. With Robyn Mary Barker and Laurence Haegi he had a particular interest in Hakea in the family Proteaceae. He was also involved in taxonomic revisions of Lawrencia, Lasiopetalum and Spyridium.

In his retirement he is presently involved in outstanding research work, finalising revisions and publications. Dr. Barker is a life member and is the current President of the Australasian Systematic Botany Society. His primary research expertise is in Biodiversity discovery, Species and populations and Ecological processes.

Selected publications

References

1948 births
20th-century Australian botanists
Living people
21st-century Australian botanists